Arthur Grahn Jennings (born 15 June 1940) is a Fijian-born former politician and New Zealand rugby union international. A lock, Jennings represented Bay of Plenty at a provincial level, and was a member of the New Zealand national side, the All Blacks, on their 1967 tour of Britain, France and Canada. He played six games for the All Blacks on that tour but did not appear in any test matches. During the 1980s he served as a member of the House of Representatives in Fiji.

Biography
Of Fijian, Tongan and English ancestry, Jennings was born in Fiji but was educated in New Zealand from an early age. He was the first Fijian to play for the All Blacks, and is the uncle of Tongan and Australian rugby league representative Michael Jennings.

In 1982 Jennings contested the Western general national constituency as a National Federation Party (NFP) candidate, and was elected to the House of Representatives. However, he left the NFP in November 1985, and subsequently lost his seat in 1987, and later unsuccessfully contested the 1999 elections as an independent.

References

1940 births
Living people
People educated at Northcote College
New Zealand rugby union players
New Zealand international rugby union players
Bay of Plenty rugby union players
Rugby union locks
Fijian emigrants to New Zealand
Fijian people of British descent
Fijian people of I-Taukei Fijian descent
Fijian people of Tongan descent
New Zealand sportspeople of Tongan descent
New Zealand people of English descent
New Zealand people of I-Taukei Fijian descent
Members of the House of Representatives (Fiji)
National Federation Party politicians